Matnin (also spelled Mitneen) is a village in northwestern Syria, administratively part of the Hama Governorate, located just west of Hama. Nearby localities include Tayzin to the north, al-Rabiaa to the west, Birin to the south and Kafr Buhum to the southeast. According to the Central Bureau of Statistics (CBS), Matnin had a population of 2,446 in the 2004 census. Its inhabitants are predominantly Sunni Muslims.

References

Populated places in Hama District